Stone Tapes is an independent record label, music collective and imprint of Joyful Noise Recordings curated by Yonatan Gat. The label was founded in 2022, branching off of Joyful Noise's artist-in-residence program, and emerged from visions and insights arising in conversations between players, producers, promoters, journalists and other indigenous artistic peers around the eponymously titled Medicine Singer's LP, which ultimately evolved into Stone Tapes' debut release.

History 
As Stone Tapes recorded and began to tour its first releases and art projects, collaborators internal to the collective took to calling the new approach "End of World Music" or "Scorched Earth Music." Despite presumed good intentions the existing conventions of the established World Music genre now seemed, in 2022 and in light of public conversations around cultural issues accelerated by reactions to the white supremacist rhetoric of the under the umbrella of the American right during the Trump administration, fetishistic and exclusionary—ultimately limiting the scope and potential of performers and releases. A new and more collective approach, balancing traditional spirit with radical new forms of musical experimentation would be the mission of the collective. As Daryl Black Eagle Jamieson said, reflecting on the Medicine Singers release, "I think it's a completely new realm of music."

In the summer of 2022, the New York Times printed a feature about this rising sense of a new direction or changed inflection of emphasis and sense of mission amongst indigenous artists, both affiliated (Joe Rainey Sr. of Niineta) and unaffiliated (Pulitzer prize winning composer of "Voiceless Mass", Raven Chacon, Laura Ortman, Suzanne Kite, Warren Realrider, Natha Young, Postcommodity, Ajilvsga and others) with a meditation on the shift in tone from one of the Medicine Singers' Daryl Black Eagle Jamieson appearing at a climax in the cycle of reflections included in the article that recalled a conversation with the mentor who taught him elements of the Wampanoag and Algonquian dialects among other things: "...Jamieson, worried [that the experimental approach] might bend those historic sounds until they broke. A 62-year-old Air Force veteran who learned the Massachusett language only as an adult, Jamieson asked his mentor, Donald Three Bears Fisher, to approve the lyrics for “Daybreak,” the album’s first single and an ecstatic aubade with pounding drums. 'He said, I want it played everywhere,' Jamieson remembered... Fisher died in 2020. 'So that’s what I’m doing.'"  Other releases from the first year of the Stone Tapes label/collective include releases by Maalem Hassan BenJaafar "Moroccan gnawa master of Innov Gnawa fame", Mamady Kouyaté "Guinean guitar legend, formerly of Bembeya Jazz", Yonatan Gat's American Quartet "featuring Mikey Coltun of Mdou Moctar, Greg Saunier of Deerhoof, and Curt Sydnor", and the legendary (and occasionally "exiled") Israeli punk band Monotonix.

See also 

 List of record labels

References

External links 

 Official Website
 Discogs
 Secretly Distribution

Israeli independent record labels
American independent record labels
Indie rock record labels
Experimental music record labels
Musical collectives
Pow woW songs